Troitskoye is a rural locality (a selo) and the administrative center of Kisnemskoye Rural Settlement, Vashkinsky District, Vologda Oblast, Russia. The population was 263 as of 2002. There are 8 streets.

Geography 
Troitskoye is located 23 km northwest of Lipin Bor (the district's administrative centre) by road. Monastyrskaya is the nearest rural locality.

References 

Rural localities in Vashkinsky District